Ragavapillai Siva (born 29 April 1967) is an Indian politician currently serving as the leader of the opposition in the Puducherry Legislative Assembly and Member of the Puducherry Legislative Assembly from Villianur constituency.

Political Career
He started his politics as a member of Dravida Munnetra Kazhagam. On 2 May, he became a Member of Legislative Assembly from Villianur. DMK President and Chief Minister of Tamil Nadu, M. K. Stalin made him the 1st President of the Dravida Munnetra Kazhagam, Puducherry.

See Also
 List of leaders of the opposition in the Puducherry Legislative Assembly

References 

Living people
1967 births